The 1990 Pro Bowl was the NFL's fortieth annual all-star game which featured the outstanding performers from the 1989 season. The game was played on Friday, February 2, 1990, at Aloha Stadium in Honolulu, Hawaii before a crowd of 50,445. The final score was NFC 27, AFC 21.

Bud Carson of the Cleveland Browns led the AFC team against an NFC team coached by Los Angeles Rams head coach John Robinson. The referee was Johnny Grier.

Jerry Gray of the Los Angeles Rams was named the game's MVP. Players on the winning NFC team received $10,000 apiece while the AFC participants each took home $5,000.

AFC roster

Offense

Defense

Special teams

NFC roster

Offense

Defense

Special teams

References

External links

Pro Bowl
Pro Bowl
Pro Bowl
Pro Bowl
Pro Bowl
American football competitions in Honolulu
February 1990 sports events in the United States